Europe's achievements in science and technology have been significant and research and development efforts form an integral part of the European economy. Europe has been the home of some of the most prominent researchers in various scientific disciplines, notably physics, mathematics, chemistry and engineering. Scientific research in Europe is supported by industry, by the European universities and by several scientific institutions. All the raw output of scientific research from Europe consistently ranks among the world's best.

Historical overview

Mathematics flourished in the Greek world from 600 BC to 300 AD. However, the study of mathematics was de-emphasized when the Roman Empire was in power, and became even less important after the fall of Rome.

Medieval Europeans were interested in mathematics for different reasons than modern mathematicians are; namely, they studied mathematics because they thought it was the basis to understand the created order of nature, as explained in Timaeus by Plato and the Book of Wisdom.

During the 17th century, Europe (and only Europe) underwent the Scientific Revolution as natural philosophers began to obtain exact measurements and base their theories on experiments and observations. During this era, mathematics and astronomy were the branches of science that spearheaded the Scientific Revolution, and princely courts were a source of patronage for the sciences. Natural philosophers of this time tried to grasp the laws of nature as a way to understand God's mind, and though Jesuits welcomed the flourishing of science, some Christian authorities instead responded to it by accusing natural philosophers of heresy.

Although the European Union was only founded in 1993, the tradition of scientific research in Europe is much older and can be traced back to the scientific revolution. Europe is home to some of the world's oldest universities, such as the University of Bologna, although the oldest European universities were, at the time of their foundation, more centered on philosophy, theology and law than on science.

In the time since World War II, science and technology has played ever more critical roles in the lives of Europeans.

Institutions

European Union and Euratom
 Directorate-General for Research
 Agencies, independent bodies and joint undertakings of the European Union and the Euratom
 European Research Council
 European Institute of Innovation and Technology
 Joint Research Centre
 Institute for Reference Materials and Measurements (IRMM)
 Institute for Transuranium Elements (ITU)
 Institute for the Protection and the Security of the Citizen (IPSC)
 Institute for Environment and Sustainability (IES)
 Institute for Health and Consumer Protection (IHCP)
 Institute for Energy (IE)
 Institute for Prospective Technological Studies (IPTS)
 Joint undertakings 
 of the European Union
  Bio-based Industries
 Clean Sky
  Electronic Components and Systems
  Fuel Cells and Hydrogen
 High-Performance Computing
 Innovative Medicines Initiative
  Single European Sky Air Traffic Management Research
  Shift-2-Rail
 of the Euratom
 Fusion for Energy
 Joint European Torus
 European University Institute
 European Research Infrastructure Consortia

Other intergovernmental European research organisations
 European Organization for Nuclear Research (CERN) 
 European Forest Institute
 European Molecular Biology Laboratory (EMBL)
 European Bioinformatics Institute
 European Southern Observatory (ESO)
 European Space Agency (ESA)
 International Centre for Theoretical Physics
 International Council for the Exploration of the Sea
 International Iberian Nanotechnology Laboratory
 International Institute of Molecular and Cell Biology (IIMCB) in Warsaw
 ITER
 Joint Institute for Nuclear Research

Scientific fields

Physics

Chemistry

Mathematics

Mathematics flourished in the Greek world from 600 BC to 300 AD, but mathematical philosophy was de-emphasized over practical methods during the rise of the Roman Empire. After the fall of Rome, many ancient mathematical works were lost or destroyed, and the role of mathematics was further reduced by Europe's political fragmentation.

The idea of Arabic numerals came to Europe , but was not immediately popular due to use of the old Roman numerals. The system of Arabic numerals was popularized by Italian mathematician Leonardo de Pisa (more famously known as Fibonacci), and had finally become popular among merchants in Italy, France, Germany, and Britain for accounting by 1400, and in use by most textbooks by the mid-15th century.

During the first half of the 16th century, Scipione del Ferro and Niccolò Fontana Tartaglia discovered how to solve cubic equations. In 1545, Gerolamo Cardano published them in his book Ars Magna, along with a method to solve quartic equations discovered by Lodovico Ferrari.

Our current notations for addition, subtraction, multiplication, and division, and equations were also invented in Europe. The + and – signs were first used in warehouses, then appeared in print in 1526 in a German math book. The symbols for multiplication and division came later. The equal sign was first used in England in 1557. Mathematicians represented unknown quantities in equations with letters by 1600.

The first systematic treatment of decimal notation, De Thiende (a book by Simon Stevin), was published in 1585.

Though mathematics had a secondary role in the mid-16th century, it became considered the most powerful tool of scientific research by the 18th century, as a general mathematization of civil life took place.

Biological and earth sciences

Psychology

See also

 European Research Area
 Framework Programmes for Research and Technological Development
 Horizon Europe
 Lisbon Strategy
 Science and technology in Africa
 Science and technology in Asia

References

External links 
Key figures of science, technology and innovation
 Science, technology and innovation in Europe archive